A theatre in the round, arena theatre or central staging is a space for theatre in which the audience surrounds the stage.

Theatre-in-the-round was common in ancient theatre, particularly that of Greece and Rome, but was not widely explored again until the latter half of the 20th century.

The Glenn Hughes Penthouse Theatre in Seattle, Washington was the first theatre-in-the-round venue built in the United States.  It first opened on May 19, 1940 with a production of Spring Dance, a comedy by playwright Philip Barry.  The 160-seat theatre is located on the campus of the University of Washington in Seattle and is on the National Register of Historic Places.

In 1947, Margo Jones established America's first professional theatre-in-the-round company when she opened her Theater '47 in Dallas.

The stage design as developed by Margo Jones was used by directors in later years for such well-known shows as the Tony Award-winning musical Fun Home, the original stage production of Man of La Mancha, and all plays staged at the ANTA Washington Square Theatre (demolished in the late 1960s), including Arthur Miller's autobiographical After the Fall. Such theatres had previously existed in colleges, but not in professional spaces for almost two millennia. It is also a popular setup used in contemporary pop concerts in an arena or stadium setting.

Theater in the round is a particularly appropriate setting for staging of dramas using Bertolt Brecht's alienation effect, which stands in opposition to the more traditional Stanislovski technique in drama.  Whereas the Stanislovski school of acting attempts to immerse the audience so deeply in belief of its characters that they can imagine themselves as the character, the Brechtian alienation effect deliverately tries to remind the audience that this is a fictional representation.  Alienation techniques include tactics as obvious as displaying placards or posters around the set.  With theater in the round, merely keeping the audience lit so that each audience member is constantly aware of the rest of the audience can act as an alienation technique.

Stage configuration
The stage is always in the centre with the audience arranged on all sides, and is most commonly rectangular, circular, diamond, or triangular. Actors may enter and exit through the audience from different directions or from below the stage. The stage is usually on an even level with or below the audience in a "pit" or "arena" formation.

This configuration lends itself to high-energy productions and anything that requires audience participation. It is favoured by producers of classical theatre and it has continued as a creative alternative to the more common proscenium format.

In effect, theatre-in-the-round removes the fourth wall and brings the actor into the same space as the audience.  This is often problematic for proscenium or end stage trained actors who are taught that they must never turn their backs to the audience, something that is unavoidable in this format. However, it allows for strong and direct engagement with the audience.

It is also employed when theatrical performances are presented in non-traditional spaces such as restaurants, public areas such as fairs or festivals, or street theater. Set design is often minimal in order not to obscure the audience's view of the performance.

History
Theatre-in-the-round was common in ancient theatre, particularly that of Greece and Rome, but was not widely explored again until the latter half of the 20th century.

In Margo Jones' survey of theatre-in-the-round, the first two sources of central staging in the United States she identified were the productions by Azubah Latham and Milton Smith at Columbia University dating from 1914, and T. Earl Pardoe's productions at Brigham Young University in 1922.

In 1924, Gilmor Brown founded the Fair Oaks Playbox in Pasadena, California, an important early practitioner of central staging in addition to other stage configurations that it pioneered in its advent of flexible staging.  As Indicated by Jones, the centrally staged productions of the Fair Oaks Playbox were followed approximately eight years later by the work of Glenn Hughes in his Seattle Penthouse.

Stephen Joseph was the first to popularise the form in the United Kingdom from the US in the 1950s and set up theatres-in-the-round in Newcastle-under-Lyme and the Studio Theatre in Scarborough. The current theatre, opened in 1996, is known as the Stephen Joseph Theatre. Joseph was reputed to have once rhetorically asked, "Why must authorities stand with their back to a wall?" His answer was: "So nobody can knife them from behind."

Sam Walters set up an impromptu performance space in the upstairs of the Orange Tree pub in Richmond, London in the early 1970s and subsequently moved across the road to a permanent Orange Tree Theatre.

In 1972, RG Gregory set up the Word and Action theatre company in Dorset in England to work exclusively in theatre-in-the-round. Gregory sought to create a grammar that would enable actors to maximise the form's potential for connecting with the audience both as individuals and as a collective. All Word and Action productions were performed in normal lighting conditions, without costumes or makeup.

Uses in television and concert halls
The innovations of Margo Jones were an obvious influence on Albert McCleery when he created his Cameo Theatre for television in 1950. Continuing until 1955, McCleery offered dramas seen against pure black backgrounds instead of walls of a set. This enabled cameras in the darkness to pick up shots from any position.

Richard Nixon's 1968 U.S. Presidential campaign staged nine live televised question and answer sessions using a ground-breaking theatre-in-the-round format, adapted for a live televised audience. The first time use of the staging device was memorialized in the book, The Selling of the President 1968  by Joe McGinniss. The producer of these Nixon "Man in the Arena"  programs was Roger Ailes, who later went to on start Fox News. Ailes' innovation of the theatre-in-the-round format for candidate forums became the blueprint for modern "town hall" candidate formats and even multiple-candidate debates.

Elvis Presley's '68 Comeback Special TV program was performed with the musicians seated using a raised staging in-the-round format.

When an arena staging was conceived for the progressive-rock group Yes by their tour manager Jim Halley in the mid-1970s, it prompted a redesign of rock concerts and venue seating arrangements.

The politics of the round
The politics of theatre-in-the-round were explored most deliberately by RG Gregory. In his view the lit space of a proscenium arch is analogous to the seat of power; the audience adopts the role of passive receivers. In traditional theatre design, maximum care is taken with sight lines in order to ensure that the actor can engage every member of the audience at the same time.

However, once removed from the picture frame of the arch, the actors are compelled to turn their back on some members of the audience and so necessarily lose exclusive command of the acting space. All members of the audience can see the actor, but the actor can no longer see all of them. At this point, in order for the play to function, the audience themselves must be allowed to become key conductors of the meaning of the performance.

Some, like the writer Mick Fealty, have stressed a close analogy between Gregory's description of the rudimentary dynamics of theater-in-the-round with the network effect of Internet-based communication in comparison to traditional broadcast and marketing channels.

Arena stage archive
George Mason University in Fairfax, Virginia is home to the largest arena stage archive and contains material from the theatre's 50-year history. Included in the collection are photographs, production notebooks, scrapbooks, playbills, oral histories and handwritten correspondence.

Notable examples

Australia
La Boite Theatre Building, Brisbane (no longer used as a theatre)
 Roundhouse Theatre, Brisbane (replacing the La Boite Theatre Building)

Canada
Globe Theatre, Regina, Saskatchewan
 Seton Auditorium, Mount Saint Vincent University, Halifax, Nova Scotia

France
L'Européen, Paris
Théâtre en Rond, Sassenage and Fresnes

Hong Kong
 Theater in the Wild, Hong Kong Disneyland, Lantau Island

Japan
 The Enchanted Tiki Room: Stitch Presents Aloha e Komo Mai!, Tokyo Disney Resort, Urayasu, Chiba

Malta
Saint James Cavalier Theatre, Valletta

Poland
Theater Scena STU, Kraków

United Kingdom
Sheffield. Crucible theatre. Most famous for hosting the World Snooker Championships since 1977.

Greater London
@sohoplace, Soho
Cockpit Theatre, Marylebone
Orange Tree Theatre, Richmond
Pembroke Theatre, Croydon (closed 1962)

Greater Manchester
Octagon Theatre, Bolton
Royal Exchange Theatre, Manchester

Elsewhere
Blue Orange Theatre, Birmingham
The Castle Theatre, Wellingborough (can be in the round or normal theatre format)
New Vic Theatre, Newcastle-under-Lyme
The Round, Newcastle upon Tyne (closed 2008)
Stephen Joseph Theatre, Scarborough
 The Dukes, Lancaster
Everyman Theatre, Liverpool
Pyramid Theatre, Leeds University Union, Leeds (formerly Raven Theatre)

United States

Arizona
NAU Theatre, Flagstaff, Arizona
Celebrity Theatre, Phoenix, Arizona
Hale Centre Theatre, Gilbert, Arizona
Theater Works, Peoria, Arizona

California
Wells Fargo Pavilion, Sacramento, California (Home of California Musical Theatre's Music Circus)
The Rock Forum, Anaheim, California
Glendale Centre Theatre, Glendale, California 
Golden Bough Playhouse, Carmel-by-the-Sea, California
Marian Theatre, Santa Maria, California 
Solvang Festival Theater, Solvang, California
Old Globe Theatre, San Diego, California 
Cassius Carter Centre Stage (demolished 2008)
Cheryl and Harvey White Theatre
Circle Star Theater, San Carlos, California (torn down for office buildings)
Riverside Community Players, Riverside, California (built in 1953)
Valley Music Theater, Los Angeles, California (built 1963, demolished 2007)
Walt Disney's Enchanted Tiki Room, Disneyland, Anaheim, California

Colorado
The Space Theatre, Denver, Colorado

District of Columbia
Arena Stage, Washington, D.C.

Florida
Walt Disney's Enchanted Tiki Room (previously Tropical Serenade), Adventureland, Magic Kingdom (Walt Disney World), Bay Lake, Florida
From 1998 to 2011, The Enchanted Tiki Room (Under New Management) operated in this attraction's space.
Stitch's Great Escape!, Tomorrowland, Magic Kingdom (Walt Disney World), Bay Lake, Florida 
Preceding attractions include Flight to the Moon (1971–1975), Mission to Mars (1975–1993) and the ExtraTERRORestrial Alien Encounter (1994–2003).
Festival of the Lion King, Disney's Animal Kingdom (Walt Disney World), Bay Lake, Florida

Illinois
Marriott Theatre, Lincolnshire, Illinois 
Mill Run Playhouse, Niles, Illinois (demolished 1984)
Richmond Hill Theatre, Geneseo, Illinois 
Cornstock Theatre, Peoria, Illinois

Indiana
Wagon Wheel Theatre, Warsaw, Indiana

Iowa
Flanagan Studio Theater, Grinnell, Iowa

Kansas 

 Mark A. Chapman Theatre, Kansas State University, Manhattan, Kansas

Maryland
Colonial Players, Annapolis, Maryland
Shady Grove Music Fair, Gaithersburg, Maryland (Demolished)
Painters Mill Music Fair, Owings Mills, Maryland (Demolished 1991)

Massachusetts
North Shore Music Theatre, Beverly, Massachusetts 
Cape Cod Melody Tent, Hyannis, Massachusetts
South Shore Music Circus, Cohasset, Massachusetts
The Little Theatre, Newton
Balch Arena Theater, Medford, Massachusetts

Minnesota
Theatre in the Round Players, Minneapolis, Minnesota
Rarig Center Arena, Minneapolis, Minnesota
Arena Theater, Northfield, Minnesota (Built 1967, mothballed 2011)

Missouri
Kauffman Center for the Performing Arts, Kansas City, Missouri

Nevada
Le Rêve Theater inside Wynn Las Vegas, Las Vegas, Nevada (opened 2005, closed 2020.)
LOVE Theatre inside The Mirage, Las Vegas, Nevada

New Jersey
Seton Hall Theatre in the Round, South Orange, New Jersey

New York
Circle Repertory Company, New York City, New York
The Irish Classical Theatre in Buffalo, New York
NYCB Theatre at Westbury, Westbury, New York
Circle in the Square Theatre in New York City, New York (can also be configured as a thrust stage)
Arena Theatre at University at Albany, SUNY in Albany, New York

Ohio
The Front Row, Highland Heights, Ohio (Demolished 1994)
Porthouse Theatre, Kent, Ohio

Oregon
The Thomas Theater, Ashland, Oregon (one of the theaters used for the Oregon Shakespeare Festival)

Pennsylvania
F. Otto Haas Stage, Philadelphia, Pennsylvania
Valley Forge Music Fair, Devon, Pennsylvania (demolished 1996)

South Carolina
Longstreet Theatre, Columbia, South Carolina

Tennessee
Ula Love Doughty Carousel Theatre, Knoxville, Tennessee

Texas
Plaza Theatre Company, Cleburne, Texas
Artisan Center Theater, Hurst
Whisenhunt Stage, Austin, Texas
Casa Mañana, Fort Worth, Texas (converted to thrust stage in 2003)
Theatre '47, Dallas, Texas
Mary Moody Northen Theatre, Austin, Texas
Arena Theater, Houston, Texas

Utah
Hale Centre Theatre, Sandy, Utah
West Valley Performing Arts Center, West Valley City, Utah

Virginia
The Barksdale Theater in Richmond, Virginia

Washington
Glenn Hughes Penthouse Theatre, Seattle, Washington
ACT Theatre, Seattle, Washington

Wisconsin
Fireside Dinner Theater, Fort Atkinson, Wisconsin
Melody Top Theatre, Milwaukee, Wisconsin (1963–86)

In popular culture
In the novel The Prestige by Christopher Priest, the magician Rupert Angier courts controversy by writing that stage magic should be performed "in the round" rather than in theatres with a proscenium arch.
The English progressive rock band Yes were the first rock-era group to perform "in the round" during their 1978–79 Tormato tour. The band also performed using a round, rotating stage during portions of their Drama and Union tours in 1980 and 1991, respectively.
The second tour of the global country-pop superstar Shania Twain, the Up! Tour (2003/04), had a stage configuration in the style of "in the round". The tour was one of the most successful tours of 2004, and served to promote the RIAA diamond certified album, "Up!" (2002).
The Into the Millennium Tour by the American boy band Backstreet Boys featured an "in the round" stage. The tour, which began in 1999 and ended in March 2000, is one of the most successful of all time.
British rock band Def Leppard played "in the round" for several tours in the late 1980s and early 1990s. Their 1989 live VHS release was entitled Live: In the Round, in Your Face. "In-the-round is an incredibly, insanely aerobic kind of thing…" remarked singer Joe Elliott, who gave up drinking on the Hysteria tour to cope with the physical demands. "You can't stand still; you've got to keep moving. The [other members of the band] had identical microphones on either side of the stage, so they could stand still for a little bit. I had to keep moving."
To evoke a three-ring circus, American singer Britney Spears used an in-the-round setting for her 2009 The Circus Starring Britney Spears tour.
Stand-up comedians have performed specials "in the round," such as Dane Cook: Vicious Circle and Louis C.K.'s Oh My God.
 The Spice Girls used a circular, in-the-round stage for their Christmas in Spiceworld tour in 1999.
 U2's 360° Tour used a very large circular stage.
 The Dixie Chicks' Top of the World Tour used a circular stage, except in venues where it was an end stage.
 Metallica have used a rectangular, diamond or oval-shaped stage in the center of the arena, beginning with their 1991 Wherever We May Roam Tour. On different tours, they have included an area within the stage, called "the snake pit", where audience members can watch the show. Their 2012 European Black Album Tour used this format.
 In the musical The Producers Max Bialystock remarks that he invented "theater in the square".
 Roger Waters' 2022 This Is Not a Drill tour is performed in the round with a large cross-shaped stage. Hanging overhead is a cross-shaped video screen arrangement that matches the shape of the stage.

See also
Arena
The Castle of Perseverance
Thrust stage

References

Theatre
Stage terminology